The 1977–78 Roller Hockey Champions Cup was the 13th edition of the Roller Hockey Champions Cup organized by CERH.

Barcelona achieved their third title.

Teams
The champions of the main European leagues, and Sporting CP as title holders, played this competition, consisting in a double-legged knockout tournament. As Sporting CP qualified also as Spanish champion, Valongo joined also the competition.

Bracket

Source:

References

External links
 CERH website

1977 in roller hockey
1978 in roller hockey
Rink Hockey Euroleague